ZMT may refer to:
Zentrum für Marine Tropenforschung (Centre for Tropical Marine Ecology), Bremen, Germany
Zomig ZMT, a brand name for a dissolving tablet of zolmitriptan
Maringarr language of Australia (ISO 639-3 code)
Masset Airport, British Columbia, Canada (IATA code)
Zakłady Mechaniczne Tarnów (Tarnów Mechanical Works), a Polish defense industry manufacturer